Stadio Cino e Lillo Del Duca is a multi-purpose stadium in Ascoli Piceno, Italy.  It is currently used mostly for football matches and the home of Ascoli Calcio 1898 F.C. The stadium was built in 1962 and holds 12,461.

History
The stadium was named after the two brothers Cino and Lillo Del Duca, who were entrepreneurs in publishing, founders (on behalf of Enrico Mattei) of the newspaper Il Giorno and supporters of the city football club.

The stadium has twice hosted Italy's end-of-year rugby union international: victories against Samoa on 28 November 2009 and 8 November 2014.

References

External links
 Stadium picture

Cino e Lillo Del Luca
Ascoli Calcio 1898 F.C.
Buildings and structures in Ascoli Piceno
Multi-purpose stadiums in Italy
Cino